Versatile Varieties, also known as Bonnie Maid Versatile Varieties and Bonny Maid Versatile Varieties, is a TV series that ran from 1949 to 1951 on NBC, CBS and ABC under three different formats. The sponsor was Bonnie Maid Linoleum.

Program formats
On NBC, from August 29, 1949, to January 19, 1951, on Fridays from 9pm to 9:30pm ET, was a variety show set in a nightclub, where those not performing in the various acts would be seen sitting at tables on the sidelines. Eva Marie Saint, Anne Francis, Edie Adams, and Janis Paige appeared as "Bonnie Maids", dressed in plaid kilts, hosting and doing live ads for the sponsor. Original host George Givot was replaced after two months by comedian Harold Barry, and then later by singer Bob Russell. Guest stars included Mary Small, Lon Chaney, Jr., Bela Lugosi, and Peggy Ann Garner. On January 26, replaced by Henry Morgan's Great Talent Hunt, which lasted until June 1.
On CBS, from January 28 to July 22, 1951, a Sunday morning children's TV show hosted by Lady Iris Mountbatten called Versatile Varieties, Junior Edition.
On ABC, from September 21, 1951, to December 14, 1951, seven episodes were aired Fridays 9:30 to 10pm ET, alternating with sci-fi anthology Tales of Tomorrow.

Personnel
Mark Hawley was the director. Merrill Joels was the announcer.

See also
1949-50 United States network television schedule
1950-51 United States network television schedule
1951-52 United States network television schedule

References

Bibliography
Alex McNeil, Total Television, Fourth edition (New York: Penguin Books, 1980) 
Tim Brooks and Earle Marsh, The Complete Directory to Prime Time Network TV Shows, Third edition (New York: Ballantine Books, 1964)

External links
Versatile Varieties at IMDB
Versatile Varieties at CTVA with list of episodes

1949 American television series debuts
1951 American television series endings
American Broadcasting Company original programming
Black-and-white American television shows
CBS original programming
NBC original programming